was a Japanese sprinter. He competed in the men's 100 metres and men's 200 metres events at the 1920 Summer Olympics. His niece is the actress Mariko Kaga.

References

External links

1898 births
1946 deaths
Place of birth missing
Japanese male sprinters
Olympic male sprinters
Olympic athletes of Japan
Athletes (track and field) at the 1920 Summer Olympics
Japan Championships in Athletics winners